Lewis Hamilton was an Irish Anglican priest in the first half of the 18th-century.

Hamilton was born in Enniskillen and educated at Trinity College, Dublin. He was appointed  Archdeacon of Elphin in 1723.  He died in 1743.

References 

Archdeacons of Elphin
Deans of Elphin
People from Enniskillen
18th-century Irish Anglican priests
1743 deaths